Carnage (stylised in all caps) is a 2021 studio album by Australian musicians Nick Cave and Warren Ellis. Longtime collaborators in Nick Cave and the Bad Seeds and Grinderman, Carnage is their first full-length studio album as a duo, apart from their extensive work in film music. It was recorded during the COVID-19 lockdown. Carnage was released digitally on 25 February 2021 via Goliath Records. A CD and vinyl release via Goliath was scheduled for 28 May 2021, but was pushed back to 18 June 2021.

At the 2021 ARIA Music Awards, the album was nominated for Best Adult Contemporary Album.

Songs from Carnage were first performed by Cave and Ellis with singers and a string quartet in the documentary film This Much I Know to Be True, directed by Andrew Dominik and released in 2022. The documentary was filmed in spring 2021 before Cave and Ellis's UK tour.

Critical reception 

Upon its release, Carnage received widespread acclaim from music critics. At Metacritic, which assigns a normalised rating out of 100 to reviews from professional publications, the release received an average score of 91 (the only album of 2021 to achieve this feat other than American musician Taylor Swift's Red), based on 21 reviews, indicating "universal acclaim". It is Cave's third consecutive studio album to score above 90 on the site. It was ranked the highest-rated album of 2021 by Metacritic, whose list only includes new albums receiving at least 15 reviews from professional critics. As a result, Cave is the only artist to have won Metacritic's Album of the Year three times, following wins for Skeleton Tree (2016) and for Ghosteen (2019).

Reviewing the album for AllMusic, Mark Deming claimed that "There is greater sense of spontaneous energy in Carnage than in much of Cave's music of this period, and that doesn't blunt the craft of this album. It's the work of two collaborative artists who are in the midst of a later-period renaissance that has spawned powerful, evocative music that speaks to its time without being confined to the crises that sparked its creation." Robin Murray also gave the album a positive assessment in a review for Clash, declaring that it "stands as something unique, the sound of two vastly experienced musicians removing themselves from expectations, and constructing something both beautiful and visceral, tender and blood-thirsty, wholly terrifying and completely absorbing." At The Daily Telegraph, Neil McCormick described the mood of the album as being "infused with profound and almost inescapable grief. But as this particularly audacious singer-songwriter grapples with isolation, loneliness, loss and the hard emotional graft of endurance, all set against a backdrop of apocalyptic threat, the personal becomes universal. Carnage may just be the greatest lockdown album yet."

Writing for The Guardian, Alexis Petridis compared it to Cave's previous album; "If it doesn’t feel quite as remarkable as Ghosteen, that tells you more about the previous album than the quality of Carnage: Cave and Ellis’s musical approach is still vividly alive, the dense, constantly shifting sound complementing the richness of Cave’s writing now." Helen Brown was less critical in the review for The Independent, stating that "Although the sonic mood mellows after the first two tracks, listeners will be invited to share the transcendent joy in memories of a lost child; the awe of an uxorious lover whose prayer-like love for his wife is a continual saving grace; and the frustration of a caged man with an “open road” of a heart." Andrew Trendell of NME gave the album a perfect score, writing, "Carnage is arguably Cave and Ellis' best record since The Bad Seeds' latter day reinvention on 2013's Push the Sky Away, or maybe even Abattoir Blues. It's certainly two master craftsmen at the peak of their melodramatic powers." Martin Boulton of The Sydney Morning Herald praised the album's "vast, cinematic quality" and Cave's lyricism.  In Hot Press Pat Carty concluded that "Carnage is a phenomenal piece of art, where these two giants, these wizards of Aus and old and odd, surpass themselves, again."

Year-end lists

Track listing

Personnel
Credits adapted from the album's liner notes and Tidal.

 Nick Cave – vocals, background vocals, percussion, piano, synthesizer, arrangements, production, mixing, sleeve design
 Warren Ellis – background vocals, autoharp, drum machine, alto flute, glockenspiel, tenor guitar, harmonium, loops, piano, synthesizer, viola, violin, arrangements, production, mixing
 Strings (tracks 1–6, 8)
 Eloisa-Fleur Thom – violin
 Alessandro Ruisi – violin
 Luba Tunnicliffe – viola
 Max Ruisi – cello
 Choir (tracks 1, 3, 5, 8)
 Hannah Cooke
 Nicholas Madden
 Amy Carson
 Timothy Dickinson
 Sarah Dacey
 Esmeralda Conde Ruiz – choir conductor
 Thomas Wydler – drums (track 2)
 Matt Colton – mastering
 Luis Almau – drums (track 4), acoustic guitar (track 4), arrangements, mixing, engineering
 Ben Jones – assistance
 Ramera Abraham – assistance
 Colin McIlhagga – assistance
 Hingston Studio – sleeve design

Charts

Weekly charts

Year-end charts

References 

2021 albums
Nick Cave albums
Warren Ellis (musician) albums